Gədikqışlaq (also, Gyadikoyeydlyar and Gyadikseydlyar) is a village and municipality in the Quba Rayon of Azerbaijan.  It has a population of 627.  The municipality consists of the villages of Gədikqışlaq, İdrisqışlaq, and Gədik.

References

External links

Populated places in Quba District (Azerbaijan)